Alternative 4 is the fourth album by the British rock band Anathema. It was released on 22 June 1998 through Peaceville Records. Like Eternity, Alternative 4 is sung with clean vocals. Various reviews categorised this album as experimental, depressing and atmospheric.

Background

The title of the album is derived from Leslie Watkins' book Alternative 3. Bassist and co-principal songwriter Duncan Patterson had read it a few years before they wrote the album. The book is about conspiracy theories, and most songs on Alternative 4 are about trust. Patterson is now playing in a band with same title, and the songs are based on similar themes.

It is the last album with Patterson, and also the only album released without John Douglas. He was replaced by Shaun Steels in 1997 but returned in 1998.

Track listing

Personnel

 Vincent Cavanagh - vocals, guitars
 Shaun Steels - drums
 Duncan Patterson - bass, keyboards, piano
 Danny Cavanagh - guitars, keyboards, piano

Guest musicians
 Andy Duncan - drum loops on "Empty"
 George Rucci - violin

Production
 Duncan Patterson - cover concept
 Tim Spear - cover art
 Noel Summerville - mastering
 Doug Cook - mixing assistant
 Simon Dawson - engineering assistant
 Kit Woolven - producer, mixing
 Lili Wilde - photography (band)

References

1998 albums
Anathema (band) albums
Peaceville Records albums